Helena Krasowska (b. 1973) Polish linguist, professor at the Institute of Slavic Studies of the Polish Academy of Sciences in Warsawand visiting professor at the Center for Eastern Europe at the University of Warsaw.

Career
Since 2004, employed at the Institute of Slavic Studies of the Polish Academy of Sciences (IS PAN), where she defended her doctoral thesis entitled "The language of Polish highlanders in Bukowina" („Język polskich górali na Bukowinie”) and the habilitation dissertation entitled "Polish minority in south-eastern Ukraine" („Mniejszość polska na południowo-wschodniej Ukrainie”). She is currently working as a professor IS PAN.
She specializes in issues related to dialectology, sociolinguistics, ethnology, and folklore. Scientific interests focus on the issues of national and linguistic minorities, linguistic biographies, cultural borderlands, linguistic contacts, multilingualism, multi-social and individual memory. She is particularly interested in Bukovina.
She conducts field research in Ukraine, Moldova, Romania and Georgia.
Her achievements include 7 original monographs and 8 co-authored monographs.  He translates poetry from Polish to Ukrainian, writes essays and poems.

Publications
 The Polish Minority in South-Eastern Ukraine, Warszawa: Instytut Slawistyki PAN, 2017, 
 Соціолінгвістичний компендіум (A sociolinguistic compendium), Kijów: Polska Akademia Nauk 2020.  (współautorzy: Олексій Сухомлинов, Петро Сигеда)
 Języki mniejszości. Status – prestiż – dwujęzyczność – wielojęzyczność (Minority languages. Status - prestige - bilingualism - multilingualism), Warszawa: Studium Europy Wschodniej UW, 2020 
 Świadectwo zanikającego dziedzictwa. Mowa polska na Bukowinie: Rumunia – Ukraina (A testimony of vanishing heritage. Polish speech in Bukovina: Romania - Ukraine). Warszawa: Instytut Slawistyki PAN, 2018.   (e-book) (Helena Krasowska, Magdalena Pokrzyńska, Lech Aleksy Suchomłynow)
 Mniejszość polska na południowo-wschodniej Ukrainie (The Polish Minority in South-Eastern Ukraine), Warszawa: Slawistyczny Ośrodek Wydawniczy, 2012, 
 Górale polscy na Bukowinie Karpackiej. Studium socjolingwistyczne i leksykalne (Polish highlanders in Carpathian Bukovina. A sociolinguistic and lexical study), Warszawa: Slawistyczny Ośrodek Wydawniczy, 2006

Awards 

 Meritorious for Polish Culture (2011)
 Silver Cross of Merit (2018)
 Bronze Medal for Merit to Culture – Gloria Artis (2019)
Bene Merito honorary badge (2021)

References

External links
 
 
 

1973 births
Living people
Linguists from Poland
Academic staff of the University of Warsaw
Academic staff of the Polish Academy of Sciences
Women linguists
20th-century linguists
21st-century linguists
20th-century women scientists
21st-century women scientists
20th-century Polish women
21st-century Polish women
21st-century Polish scientists
20th-century Polish scientists
Recipients of the Silver Cross of Merit (Poland)
 Class 3
Recipients of the Decoration of Honor Meritorious for Polish Culture